Joel Cox (born April 2, 1942) is an American film editor. He is best known for collaborating with Clint Eastwood in over 30 films.

Life and career
Cox has been working in film since appearing as a baby in Random Harvest (1942). He started in the mailroom at Warner Bros. in 1961. Rudi Fehr, a well-known editor and executive at Warner Bros., made Cox an apprentice editor about 3 years later. As was common in the era, Cox worked as an uncredited assistant for several years. His first credit as an assistant editor was for The Rain People, which was directed by Francis Ford Coppola and edited by Barry Malkin. His first credit as the editor was for Farewell, My Lovely (1975), which was directed by Dick Richards and co-edited by the veteran editor Walter A. Thompson. Cox had just finished working as Thompson's assistant on Rafferty and the Gold Dust Twins (1975), which was also directed by Richards. Cox worked on two more of Richards' films, March or Die (1977 - as assistant editor) and Death Valley (1982).

Cox has had a notable collaboration with Clint Eastwood that commenced with the 1976 film The Outlaw Josey Wales, for which Cox was Ferris Webster's assistant. Cox and Webster were co-editors on The Gauntlet (1977) and on several more of Eastwood's subsequent films. Starting with Sudden Impact (1983), Cox became Eastwood's principal editor. Cox has been quoted as saying that, over their 30-year partnership, Eastwood has re-cut only a single scene that Cox put together. Gary D. Roach, who worked as Cox's assistant from the mid-1990s, became Cox's co-editor on Eastwood's films with Letters from Iwo Jima (2006). Cox's long streak editing each of Eastwood's films ended with Sully, which was edited by another of his former assistants, Blu Murray.

In addition to his career in the film industry, since 2000 Cox and his family have owned and managed a vineyard and winery near Paso Robles, California.

Cox won the 1992 Academy Award for Best Film Editing for Unforgiven. He has been elected as a member of the American Cinema Editors. On November 25, 2008, Clint Eastwood presented Cox the first Ignacy Paderewski Lifetime Achievement Award, which is named in honor of the piano virtuoso who called Paso Robles home, at the first Paso Robles Digital Film Festival. He received a nomination for the 2009 BAFTA Award for Best Editing for Changeling and for the 2015 Academy Award for Best Film Editing for American Sniper.

Filmography

The 2008 Paso Robles Digital Film Festival provides a full filmography of Joel Cox as part of his Lifetime Achievement Award.

Editor

Assistant editor

Sound department

Self

Awards

See also
List of film director and editor collaborations. Clint Eastwood and Cox have had one of the longest and most prolific collaborations in film history.

References

Further reading
 Chang's book includes an interview with Cox.

External links

 
  at The Hollywood Reporter

American Cinema Editors
American film editors
Best Film Editing Academy Award winners
Living people
1942 births
People from Los Angeles